The Ophiderini are a tribe of moths in the family Erebidae.

Taxonomy
The moths most closely related to the Ophiderini are in the tribe Calpini.

Genera
The following genera are included in the tribe.
Eudocima
Hemiceratoides

References

Calpinae
Moth tribes